The 2016 Geelong Football Club season is currently the club's 117th season of senior competition in the Australian Football League (AFL). The club also fielded its reserves team in the Victorian Football League (VFL) for the 17th season.

Overview 
Prior to the 2016 season, Dale Amos, who had been a member of Geelong's coaching group since 2009, moved to an assistant coaching position at Carlton.

Season summary

Regular season

Ladder

Finals series

Key statistics

Honours

Milestones
 Round 1 - Patrick Dangerfield (Geelong debut), Lachie Henderson (Geelong debut), Zac Smith (Geelong debut)
 Round 3 - Tom Ruggles (AFL debut)
 Round 12 - Steven Motlop (100 AFL games)
 Round 17 - Andrew Mackie (250 AFL games), Cameron Guthrie (100 AFL games)
 Round 18 - Sam Menegola (AFL debut)
 Round 19 - Corey Enright (326 AFL games, a new Geelong record), Jimmy Bartel (300 AFL games)

Others
 Round 1 - Patrick Dangerfield (2016 AFL Mark of the Year nomination)
 Round 2 - Tom Hawkins (2016 AFL Goal of the Year round winner)
 Round 4 - Zac Smith (2016 AFL Mark of the Year round winner)
 Round 7 - Josh Caddy (2016 AFL Goal of the Year nomination)
 Round 8 - Steven Motlop (2016 AFL Goal of the Year nomination)
 Round 9 - Tom Hawkins (2016 AFL Mark of the Year nomination)
 Round 12 - Steven Motlop (2016 AFL Goal of the Year nomination)
 Round 17 - Patrick Dangerfield (2016 AFL Goal of the Year nomination)

Notes
 Key

 H ^ Home match.
 A ^ Away match.

 Notes
Geelong's scores are indicated in bold font.

References

External links
 Official website of the Geelong Football Club
 Official website of the Australian Football League

2016
Geelong Football Club